NUR Reactor is an open pool research reactor at Centre de Dévéloppement des Techniques Nucléaires in Algiers. 

Built by INVAP, it is 1MWt and based on RA-6. It achieved first criticality in April 1989.

External links
 NUR Reactor page at the INVAP website.

Light water reactors
Nuclear research reactors